Earlestown is a town and electoral ward in the Metropolitan Borough of St Helens in Merseyside, England. It forms the western part of the wider Newton-le-Willows urban area. At the 2011 Census the ward population was 10,830.

History
Earlestown is named after Sir Hardman Earle (11 July 1792 – 25 January 1877) a slave owner whose family was steeped in the slave trade. He was the Chairman of the London and North Western Railway.

In July 1831, the Warrington and Newton Railway was opened, less than 6 months after the Liverpool and Manchester railway began service. A railway station was built at the junction of the two railways, a mile west of the town of Newton in Makerfield, now Newton-le-Willows and was given the name Newton Junction. A locomotive and wagon works was built just west of the station and a model town was constructed for its workers. In 1837, the name of the station was changed to Earlestown.

Locomotive building was concentrated in another area within Newton-le-Willows. Between 1833 and 1895 the Vulcan Foundry produced some 6,000 locomotives to become the 4th largest locomotive building firm in the country, almost 70% of which were exported. Vulcan Foundry received its final steam locomotive order in 1954, while Earlestown was home to the major wagon works.

Other significant (non-railway) employers in the town included Sankey Sugar, and T&T Vicars, who produced biscuit manufacturing equipment. There were also the nearby Lyme and Wood pits, located in neighbouring village of Haydock.

Community
Newton-le-Willows has held a market by Royal Charter since the 14th century. By the 1890s, the Earlestown area of Newton-le-Willows had outgrown the older part of the town and so the market was moved to its current location in Earlestown and the market square is the town's centre-piece. Today trading takes place on Friday, with a mixed flea market/car boot sale every Saturday. The Saturday Market features many regular traders selling tools, clothing, antiques, records, DVDs, model railways, wartime memorabilia as well as cheap house clearance and bric-a-brac.

Earlestown Town Hall is an imposing building, fronted by a war memorial. In 1962 the Beatles visited Earlestown for a night gig and played at the town hall. On the same night Newton Boys Club on Graffton Street was opened by Frankie Vaughan for the local community.
 
Another significant building included the art-deco former Curzon cinema which was demolished in January 2010.

Earlestown has a small but busy town centre with many shops including high-street outlets such as Tesco, Boots, Wilko and several high street banks alongside independent retailers, bookmakers and fast-food takeaways. There are a range of traditional pubs, such as The New Market, The Ram's Head, The Railway Inn, The Griffin, and The Wellington. Earlestown is well served by many fast food outlets offering a good range of Indian and Chinese dishes as well as fish and chips and the ubiquitous McDonald's. Most of the local restaurants are curry houses; Earlestown's 'curry quarter-of-a-mile' on Queen Street has three Indian restaurants and a Tandoori take-away.

Governance
Newton-le-Willows is part of the Parliamentary constituency of St Helens North. At the 2019 general election, Conor McGinn was re-elected to this seat.

Earlestown is one of two council wards within Newton-le-Willows.

Transport
Due to its role in the history of rail travel, Earlestown has good rail connections with its railway station having frequent services to Liverpool, Manchester, Warrington and North Wales.  Earlestown is also well located as far as the road network is concerned, being close to junction 9 of the M62 motorway, junctions 21A, 22 and 23 of the M6 motorway, and the A580 East Lancashire Manchester-Liverpool road.

See also
St John the Baptist's Church, Earlestown

Gallery

References

External links

http://www.earlestown.com/
http://www.newton-le-willows.com/
The Vulcan Foundry Newton-le-Willows

Towns and villages in the Metropolitan Borough of St Helens
Newton-le-Willows